Felix Cora Jr. (born 18 February 1980) is an American professional boxer. He is a former holder of the USBA and NABF cruiserweight titles and was a contestant in the fourth season of the reality TV show The Contender.

Professional career

Early boxing career
Cora made his professional boxing debut in September 2000 with a 2nd round stoppage win over Mitchell Seigrist in Houston, Texas. Over the next three years he boxed a further 14 times, winning 12 with two draws including one draw with the then unbeaten Michael Simms. By January 2004, Cora could boast an unbeaten professional record of 13-0-2.

Title fights
In June 2004, Cora once again challenged old foe Michael Simms, this time for the vacant USBA cruiserweight title in Rosemont, Illinois. Cora won the bout via a majority decision to claim the title and to go one better than the last time he faced Simms.  Throughout the rest of 2004, Cora defended his belt twice more scoring wins over Jermell Barnes (UD12) and James Elizalde (TKO 6).

In October 2005, Cora challenged for, and won, the NABF version of the cruiserweight title beating champion Arthur Williams after Williams corner retired him in the 8th round. He would defend the belt only once against Darnell Wilson in March 2006 before losing it in his first career defeat to Russian Vadim Tokarev in May of the same year.

Cora suffered his second career defeat to unbeaten former Olympian team-mate Matt Godfrey in his very next fight. The fight which took place in April 2007 in Connecticut was also for Cora's former NABF belt which had been vacated by Tokarev. Godfrey won the fight via a 2nd round TKO.

The Contender Series
In 2008 Cora joined the cast of the 4th series of the boxing reality show, The Contender and became a member of the blue team. On 3 December 2008 he boxed his first round contest against the gold team's Joell Godfrey and won a unanimous decision over 5 rounds.  He was knocked out of the competition at the quarter final stage after meeting Canadian Troy Ross who stopped him in the 1st round. In the season finale he knocked out Tim Flamos in the 3rd round

Comeback
After a 15 month layoff Cora Jr. returned to the ring on 4 June 2010 to face Billy Willis in a fight made at heavyweight winning in the sixth round. He fought twice more in 2010 beating Rubin Williams on 19 August and traveling to Manchester in England on 13 November to lose an eliminator contest for the IBF cruiserweight title to Enad Licina. In his first fight of 2011 on 5 March Cora Jr fought abroad once more traveling to Poland to fight Pawel Kolodziej for the WBA International cruiserweight title only to lose on points over 12 rounds.

Professional boxing record

|-
|align="center" colspan=8|23 Wins (12 knockouts, 11 decisions), 6 Losses (3 knockouts, 3 decisions), 2 Draws 
|-
| align="center" style="border-style: none none solid solid; background: #e3e3e3"|Result
| align="center" style="border-style: none none solid solid; background: #e3e3e3"|Record
| align="center" style="border-style: none none solid solid; background: #e3e3e3"|Opponent
| align="center" style="border-style: none none solid solid; background: #e3e3e3"|Type
| align="center" style="border-style: none none solid solid; background: #e3e3e3"|Round
| align="center" style="border-style: none none solid solid; background: #e3e3e3"|Date
| align="center" style="border-style: none none solid solid; background: #e3e3e3"|Location
| align="center" style="border-style: none none solid solid; background: #e3e3e3"|Notes
|-align=center
|Loss
|
|align=left| Murat Gassiev
|TKO
|9
|17/04/2015
|align=left| Foxwoods Resort, Mashantucket, Connecticut
|align=left|
|-
|Win
|
|align=left| Andrae Carthron
|KO
|2 (8)
|28/03/2014
|align=left| San Luis Convention Center, Galveston, Texas
|align=left|
|-
|Win
|
|align=left| Laudelino Barros
|KO
|11 (12)
|26/10/2013
|align=left| Ginásio Esportivo Profesor José Liberatti, Osasco, Sao Paulo
|align=left|
|-
|Win
|
|align=left| Andrew Greeley
|UD
|6
|25/08/2012
|align=left| Charles T. Doyle Convention Center, Texas City, Texas
|align=left|
|-
|Loss
|
|align=left| Lateef Kayode
|UD
|10
|09/09/2011
|align=left| Grand Casino, Hinckley, Minnesota
|align=left|
|-
|Loss
|
|align=left| Pawel Kolodziej
|UD
|12
|05/03/2011
|align=left| Krynica-Zdroj
|align=left|
|-
|Loss
|
|align=left| Enad Licina
|UD
|12
|13/11/2010
|align=left| MEN Arena, Manchester
|align=left|
|-
|Win
|
|align=left| Rubin Williams
|RTD
|5
|19/08/2010
|align=left| Charles T. Doyle Convention Center, Texas City, Texas
|align=left|
|-
|Win
|
|align=left| Billy Willis
|RTD
|6
|04/06/2010
|align=left| Charles T. Doyle Convention Center, Texas City, Texas
|align=left|
|-
|Win
|
|align=left| Tim Flamos
|TKO
|3
|25/02/2009
|align=left| Foxwoods, Mashantucket, Connecticut
|align=left|
|-
|Loss
|
|align=left| Troy Ross
|TKO
|1
|28/01/2009
|align=left| Singapore
|align=left|
|-
|Win
|
|align=left| Joell Godfrey
|UD
|5
|03/12/2008
|align=left| Singapore
|align=left|
|-
|Loss
|
|align=left| Matt Godfrey
|TKO
|2
|06/04/2007
|align=left| Mohegan Sun, Uncasville, Connecticut
|align=left|
|-
|Loss
|
|align=left| Vadim Tokarev
|TKO
|4
|18/05/2006
|align=left| Seminole Hard Rock Hotel and Casino Hollywood, Hollywood, Florida
|align=left|
|-
|Win
|
|align=left| Darnell Wilson
|UD
|10
|24/03/2006
|align=left| Seminole Hard Rock Hotel and Casino Hollywood, Hollywood, Florida
|align=left|
|-
|Win
|
|align=left| Arthur Williams
|TKO
|8
|27/10/2005
|align=left| Coeur d'Alene Casino, Worley, Idaho
|align=left|
|-
|Win
|
|align=left| James Elizalde
|TKO
|6
|02/12/2004
|align=left| Northern Quest Resort & Casino, Airway Heights, Washington
|align=left|
|-
|Win
|
|align=left| Jermell Barnes
|UD
|12
|07/08/2004
|align=left| Foxwoods, Mashantucket, Connecticut
|align=left|
|-
|Win
|
|align=left| Michael Simms
|MD
|12
|25/06/2004
|align=left| Ramada Inn, Rosemont, Illinois
|align=left|
|-
|Win
|
|align=left| Jason Waller
|TKO
|3
|15/01/2004
|align=left| Arena Theater, Houston, Texas
|align=left|
|-
|Win
|
|align=left| Jesus Valadez
|TKO
|3
|05/12/2003
|align=left| International Ballroom, Houston, Texas
|align=left|
|-
|Win
|
|align=left| Alonzo "Big Country" Wright
|UD
|8
|09/08/2003
|align=left| Miami Arena, Miami, Florida
|align=left|
|-
|style="background:#abcdef;"| Draw
|
|align=left| Derrick James
|PTS
|6
|27/06/2003
|align=left| Centennial Building, Dallas, Texas
|align=left|
|-
|style="background:#abcdef;"| Draw
|
|align=left| Michael Simms
|PTS
|10
|15/03/2003
|align=left| UIC Pavilion, Chicago, Illinois
|align=left|
|-
|Win
|
|align=left| Rodney McSwain
|UD
|8
|03/08/2002
|align=left| Dodge Theatre, Phoenix, Arizona
|align=left|
|-
|Win
|
|align=left| Gary Gomez
|UD
|8
|27/06/2002
|align=left| Santa Ana Star Casino, Bernalillo, New Mexico
|align=left|
|-
|Win
|
|align=left| Kenny Snow
|UD
|4
|09/04/2002
|align=left| Ramada Inn, Rosemont, Illinois
|align=left|
|-
|Win
|
|align=left| Chris Thomas
|UD
|6
|25/01/2002
|align=left| Ramada Inn, Rosemont, Illinois
|align=left|
|-
|Win
|
|align=left| Harold Lee Lowe, Jr.
|TKO
|1
|21/12/2001
|align=left| Pechanga Resort and Casino, Temecula, California
|align=left|
|-
|Win
|
|align=left| Shawn Townsend
|KO
|1
|26/10/2001
|align=left| Pechanga Resort and Casino, Temecula, California
|align=left|
|-
|Win
|
|align=left| Kwan Manassah
|UD
|4
|25/05/2001
|align=left| Mystic Lake Casino, Prior Lake, Minnesota
|align=left|
|-
|Win
|
|align=left| Ernest Parfait
|TKO
|1
|25/01/2001
|align=left| Radisson Hotel, Houston, Texas
|align=left|
|-
|Win
|
|align=left| James Smith
|TKO
|1
|26/10/2000
|align=left| Radisson Hotel, Houston, Texas
|align=left|
|-
|Win
|
|align=left| Mitchell Seigrist
|TKO
|2
|21/09/2000
|align=left| Houston, Texas
|align=left|
|}

References

1980 births
Living people
Boxers from Texas
Cruiserweight boxers
People from Galveston, Texas
The Contender (TV series) participants
American male boxers